The Stanley Simpson Farmstead Picking Shed is a historic farm outbuilding in rural northern White County, Arkansas.  It is located off Pond Road (County Road 390) west of Arkansas Highway 157, north of Judsonia and the hamlet of Providence.  It is a small single story wood-frame structure, with a gabled roof, vertical board siding, and a foundation that consists of long wooden sled runners.  Probably built sometime between 1914 and 1939, it is the only known example in the county of a mobile strawberry picking and packing shed, designed to be moved around strawberry fields by horse at harvest time.

The building was listed on the National Register of Historic Places in 1991.

See also
National Register of Historic Places listings in White County, Arkansas

References

Agricultural buildings and structures on the National Register of Historic Places in Arkansas
National Register of Historic Places in White County, Arkansas
Strawberry production